Calostemma luteum is a perennial bulbous plant species in the Amaryllis family (Amaryllidaceae). It is native to New South Wales, South Australia and Queensland.

References 

Amaryllidoideae
Flora of New South Wales
Flora of South Australia
Flora of Queensland
Plants described in 1819